Fernando Paulo Nagle Gabeira (born February 17, 1941) is a Brazilian politician, author and journalist. He was a federal deputy for the State of Rio de Janeiro from 1995 to 2011.

He is best known for his book O que é isso, companheiro? (literally "What is this, comrade?") written in 1979. The book tells of the armed resistance to the military dictatorship in Brazil, and particularly describes the 1969 episode of the kidnapping of the American ambassador Charles Burke Elbrick, in which Gabeira took part as a member of MR8, a group trying to fight the military dictatorship installed in Brazil five years prior.

The book was made into a movie in 1997, titled Four Days in September in English. The movie was nominated for many awards, including an Oscar at the Best Foreign Language Film at the 70th Academy Awards.

Because of his role in the kidnapping of the ambassador Charles Burke Elbrick, Gabeira was considered a terrorist and banned to enter the United States and its territories until 2009. Gabeira has asked for a visa revision three times, and was denied each time. In a May 2009 interview with Ragga, Gabeira said he was in error in kidnapping the American ambassador in 1969 and that he would never participate in such activity now.

Biography 
Born February 17, 1941 in Juiz de Fora, Minas Gerais, Fernando Gabeira was one of the founding members of the Green Party of Brazil, but left the group in 2002 to join the Workers' Party. He became known for his positions sometimes considered controversial on certain societal subjects, such as the professionalization of prostitution, same-sex marriage and the legalization of cannabis. Recently he rejoined the Greens, due to his disappointment with Luiz Inácio Lula da Silva's government, and also because of the way the Worker's Party was dealing with its remaining members.

During his exile in the 1970s, Gabeira lived in several countries including Chile, Sweden and Italy. In Stockholm, where he spent most of his exile, he studied anthropology at Stockholm University and worked as a journalist as well as a metro conductor  He returned to Brazil in 1979, where he began to act as a journalist and writer, defending the end of the military regime.

After 1985, Fernando Gabeira started to support the causes of minority rights and the environment.

Gabeira has repeatedly voiced his ideological support for the legalization of marijuana, for equal marriage laws and for the legalization of abortion. He ran for the mayoral office of Rio de Janeiro in 2008, and was defeated by Eduardo Paes in the runoff round on October 26 (49.3% – 50.7%).  He also lost a bid to become Governor of Rio de Janeiro in 2010.

The knitted swimsuit affair

He lived for a decade in exile from Brazil during the military dictatorship, and returned to his country in 1979. Just after his return, a photo of Gabeira wearing a very small knitted swimsuit on Ipanema beach turned into a national scandal. Many years later, Gabeira revealed that his scandalous bathing suit was indeed the bottom part of one of his cousin Leda Nagle's bikinis.

Literary career 
In 1979, he wrote the book What is it, mate?, about his participation in the armed struggle against the military regime in Brazil (1964–1985) and his subsequent exile in Europe. The book won the Jabuti Literature Prize in the biography and (or) memories category in 1980 and was made into the film Four Days in September by filmmaker Bruno Barreto in 1997.

In 1980, he released The Twilight of the Male, a continuation of What is it, mate? .

In 1981, he launched Entradas e Bandeiras , a book in which he chronicles his return to Brazil and his abandonment of Marxist ideology, starting to fight for issues such as ecology, pleasure and sexual freedom. In the same year, he launched Hôte da utopia, in which he deepens his new ideological positioning.

In 1982, he launched Sinais de vida on Planeta Minas, in which he tells the feminist struggles against the conservative society of the Brazilian state of Minas Gerais , through the biographies of five women from Minas Gerais. Among them, Dona Beja and Ângela Diniz .

In Goiânia, 57th street – the nuclear plant in the land of the sun, launched in 1987, Gabeira narrated the radiological accident that occurred in Goiânia in September of that year.

In 2000, he launched the book Marijuana , in which he discusses the decriminalization of its use, its therapeutic functions, the social role it plays etc.

In 2006, he launched the book Navigation in the fog, under a Creative Commons license, dealing with the Leech Scandal in 2005.

In 2012, he released the book Onde Está Tudo Aquilo Agora .

In 2017, he released the book Tropical Democracy: An Apprentice's Notebook, in which he recounts the events of Dilma Rousseff's impeachment, as well as an overview of the last thirty years of Brazilian democracy.

Family

Gabeira is the son of Paulo Gabeira and Isabel Nagle, both Lebanese immigrants. His surname was aportuguesado (expression meaning transformed to fit Portuguese language sounds) from the transliterations Jabara or Gebara (in Arabic : جبارة).

He was married to Brazilian fashion designer, Yamê Reis, with whom he had two daughters, Tami and Maya. The couple divorced in 1999.

His daughter Maya has since become a top female big wave surfer. She said the trauma of her parents' divorce drove her to leave home at age 15 and go to Australia on a student program. She moved to Hawaii in 2004 at age 17 to surf world class waves. She quickly emerged as the world's top female big-wave surfer, winning global championships surfing challenging spots like Mavericks, Waimea, Todos Santos, and South Africa's shark-infested "Dungeons". She told Huck Magazine in 2007: "My dad and I are very similar. All the energy he's put into improving the country I have as well – only I've been channeling it into my surfing." She added: "My dad has a really strong character, is incredibly bright and I’ve learned a lot from him."

References

External links
Fernando Gabeira's official website (in Portuguese)

Interview to journalist Sidney Rezende (in Portuguese)
Interview with Ragga magazine, discussing how he's changed since the kidnapping, identifies daughter Tami. (in Portuguese)
Maya Gabeira's interview with Huck magazine, discussing her father. (in English)
Maya Gabeira emerges as women's surfing champion, from The Guardian discussing her family life (in English)
Surf champ Maya Gabeira discusses for The Independent her upbringing with her father (in English)
Interview with Maya Gabeira discussing her upbringing for Women's Health magazine; mother identified (in English)

1941 births
Living people
People from Juiz de Fora
People from Minas Gerais
Green Party (Brazil) politicians
Workers' Party (Brazil) politicians
Brazilian people of Lebanese descent
Members of the Chamber of Deputies (Brazil) from Rio de Janeiro (state)
Stockholm University alumni
Culture in Minas Gerais